Sabbir is a Bangladeshi cricketer. He made his first-class debut for Chittagong Division in the 2017–18 National Cricket League on 15 September 2017.

References

External links
 

Year of birth missing (living people)
Living people
Bangladeshi cricketers
Place of birth missing (living people)
Chittagong Division cricketers